Baisha is a town of Yingde, Guangdong, China. , it has one residential community and 10 villages under its administration.

References

Towns in Guangdong
Yingde